Since 1990, the biggest events in men's tennis have been the four Grand Slam tournaments, the ATP Finals and the ATP Masters tournaments, in addition to the Grand Slam Cup between 1990–99. From 1983 to 1990, men's tennis had a very strong tradition and clear hierarchy of tournaments: the Grand Slam tournaments, including Wimbledon, the US Open, the French Open, and the Australian Open; the season-ending Masters Grand Prix; and the Davis Cup. Before 1983, however, and in particular before the start of the Open Era in 1968, the hierarchy of professional tournaments changed virtually every year.  For example, in 1934, the U.S. Pro was a high-class tournament with all the best players, but just two years later, the same tournament was ordinary because only professional teachers (no leading touring pros) entered the event.

Professional tennis before the Open Era

Before the start of the Open Era and in addition to numerous small tournaments and head-to-head tours between the leading professionals, there were a few major professional tournaments that stood out during different periods:

Some survived sporadically because of financial collapses and others temporarily stood out when other important tournaments were not held:
Bristol Cup (held on the Côte d'Azur (French Riviera) at Cannes or Menton or Beaulieu) from 1920 to 1932.
Queen's Club Pro (in the 1927 and 1928).
International Pro Championship of Britain in Southport in the 1930s.
World Pro Championships in Berlin in the 1930s.
U.S Pro Hardcourt in Los Angeles, California in 1945 (the only significant professional tournament that year).
Philadelphia Pro 1950–1952.
Tournament of Champions, held at Forest Hills 1957, 1958, 1959, and also held in Australia at White City (1957, 1959) and at Kooyong (1958).
Masters Pro Round Robin in Los Angeles in 1956, 1957 and 1958.
Australian Pro in 1954, 1957, and 1958.
Madison Square Garden Pro in 1966 and 1967.
Wimbledon Pro in 1967.
There were a few team events modeled on the Davis Cup, such as the Bonnardel Cup in the 1930s and the Kramer Cup from 1961 through 1963.
Three traditional "championship tournaments" survived into the Open Era, often having all the leading players but sometimes having very depleted fields. 
The most prestigious of the three was generally the London Indoor Professional Championship.  Played between 1934 and 1990 at Wembley Arena in England, it was unofficially usually considered the world championship until 1967.
The oldest of the three was the United States Professional Championship, played between 1927 and 1999.  From 1954 through 1962, this tournament was played indoors in Cleveland and was called the "World Professional Championships".
The third major tournament was the French Professional Championship, played usually at Roland Garros from 1934 (perhaps before but the data are unclear) through 1968. The British and American championships continued into the Open Era but soon devolved to the status of minor tournaments.

Because of the instability of the professional tour, the greatest tournaments in a given year could be the three "championship tournaments" (such as in 1964) or other tournaments (such as in 1959 when the greatest tournaments probably were the Forest Hills Pro, the Masters Pro in Los Angeles, and almost all the Australian pro tournaments).

However these three tournaments were considered retrospectively by some tennis experts as the three tournaments of the professional Grand Slam (until 1967). Some years as in 1948, only one of them was held, the U.S Pro in this case, and even in 1944 none was organized : this explains why professionals players have less impressive records than those of the modern players but it doesn't mean that the banished players of the pre-Open Era were less great than their Open Era colleagues.

As with any statistics, those of tennis players should be put into the correct context because:
a) they are mixing performances of the amateur circuit (until 1967), the professional circuit (until 1967), and the open circuit (since 1968).
b) they don't always take into account the greatest events of a given year (such as the 1959 example above).

For instance, Ken Rosewall's amateur successes between 1953 and 1956 were achieved without having to compete against world-class professionals like Frank Sedgman and Pancho Gonzales. Likewise, when Rod Laver captured the amateur Grand Slam in 1962, he did not have to face opponents such as Rosewall, Lew Hoad, Pancho Segura and Andrés Gimeno, all professionals, and therefore his 1962 Grand Slam is not seen as impressive as his 1969 Grand Slam which he won in the Open Era. In 1967 Laver was omnipotent on fast courts, winning all the greatest pro tournaments that year, Wimbledon Pro (grass), the U.S. Pro (grass), Wembley Pro (indoor wood, fastest surface ever used in tennis) and the French Pro (indoor wood). In the official statistics as published by the ITF or ATP these tournaments are seldom listed because only the amateur tournaments were taken into account. Yet Laver's supremacy in 1967 was undisputed: in his statistics (19 major tournaments) three of the four previous tournaments are listed. The one tournament not chosen is 1967 Wimbledon Pro because it was a one-off event and not a "Grand Slam pro" tournament but it was probably the greatest pro event of the 60s and in particular of 1967. It indicates that the Grand Slam label in the pre-Open Era is not always attributed to the greatest tournaments of a given year.

In reality to fairly compare pre-Open Era players' records with Open Era players, it would be necessary to select from the tennis beginnings the four greatest events of each year, knowing it would change every year (some years it is difficult to choose the four greatest tennis events). Thus, for instance, Ken Rosewall's record of 23 victories, indicated above, would be reduced to about 21 tournaments "equivalent to the modern Grand Slam tournaments": Wembley Pro 1957, 1960, 1961, 1962, 1963 – New York City-Madison Square Garden Pro 1966 – French Pro 1958, 1960, 1961, 1962, 1963, 1964, 1965, 1966 – French Open 1968 – U.S. Pro 1963, 1965 – US Open 1970 – Australian Open 1971 – WCT Finals 1971, 1972. In that list, on one hand have disappeared all Rosewall's great amateur successes (Australia 1953, 1955 – Roland Garros 1953 – U.S. 1956) and also the 1972 Australian Open without eighteen of the twenty best players, but on the other hand have appeared some pro tournaments which weren't one of the three classic ones (see Ken Rosewall's article).

Most major singles titles
The three professional tournaments (Wembley Pro, French Pro, U.S. Pro) until 1967 are sometimes referred as the 'professional Grand Slam tournaments' by tennis historians, such as Robert Geist or Raymond Lee (in his Greatest Player of All time: A Statistical Analysis article).

The following table includes those major professional titles before the Open Era. Grand slam titles are different from the Pro majors and this list comprises winners of both type of titles. 

 As of the 2023 Australian Open (active players in boldface).

 Only players with 10+ Major titles listed.

Majors statistics
The draws of Pro majors were significantly smaller than the traditional Grand Slam tournaments; usually they only had 16 or even fewer professional players. Though they were the top players in the world, this meant only four rounds of play instead of the modern six or seven rounds of play.

Pro World Championship winners

In the years before the Open Era, male professionals often played more frequently in tours than in tournaments because a head-to-head tour between two tennis stars was much more remunerative than a circuit of pro tournaments and the number of professional tournaments was small. For example, Fred Perry earned U.S. $91,000 in a 1937 North American tour against Ellsworth Vines but won only U.S. $450 for his 1938 victory at the U.S. Pro Tennis Championships. Vines probably never entered a tournament between the London Indoor Professional Championship in October 1935, which he won, and the May 1939 edition of that tournament, which he lost.  In 1937, Vines played 70 matches on two tours and no matches in tournaments. Even in the 1950s, some professionals continued to play numerous tour matches.  During his first five months as a professional (January through May 1957), Ken Rosewall played 76 matches on a tour against Pancho Gonzales but only 9 matches in tournaments.  As an example of the small number of professional tournaments held before the Open Era, Joe McCauley has determined that for 1952, only 7 professional tournaments were played by the top international players, and 2 other professional tournaments (the British Pro and the German Pro) were reserved for domestic players.  However, there were professional tournament series with a point system attached which produced a pro ranking in some years, notably 1946, 1959, 1960, 1964–68.

The prevalence of head-to-head tours and the small number of professional tournaments in many years makes it necessary to consider the tours when comparing male players from before the Open Era with male players during the Open Era. The following lists the pre-Open Era professionals who won the most tours based on the information currently available.

ILTF World Championships winners

Year-end Championships winners

 Only players with 3+ YEC titles listed.

Masters Series winners

 Only players with 10+ Masters titles listed.

See also
 List of Grand Slam tournaments champions
 List of Professional Majors champions
 List of World Championship Tours winners
 List of ATP Big Titles champions
 List of ATP Masters champions
 List of ATP Finals champions and WCT Finals champions
 World number 1 male tennis player rankings
 List of ATP number 1 ranked singles tennis players

References

External links

History of tennis
m